Taal-Net Group of Schools is consortium of co-educational, selective day and boarding schools which encompasses pre-schools, primary schools, secondary schools, and Further Education and Training Colleges. The schools are situated in South Africa and Zimbabwe. The schools  are registered with Department of Education in South Africa, UMALUSI, Department of High Education in South Africa and Ministry of Education and Child Welfare in Zimbabwe.

Schools in South Africa were established in 2009 at 51 Maxwell Street, Kempton Park as a computer training institute and it grew into school which are spread in the Gauteng and Mpumalanga Provinces in South Africa. Schools in Zimbabwe is based in Greendale (Mazowe Area) in Mashonaland Central.

Taal-Net Group of School has many branches which include
 Glen Austin, Midrand, South Africa
 Pretoria, South Africa
 Glendale,  Zimbabwe
 Kempton Park, South Africa
 Beula Park, Germiston
Beula Park, South Africa
Turfontein, South Africa
Randburg, South Africa
Eastview,Harare  Zimbabwe
Mvurwi,Mashonaland Central Zimbabwe
Roodeport, South Africa
Brentwood Park Benoni, South Africa

Taalnet East view School is the first Taalnet School in Harare but the second in Zimbabwe after Glendale school. Taalnet Eastview primary school is found in Eastlea and the school was established after a lot of enquiries from the parents in Harare who could not afford to send their children to Glendale every day.

Taal-Net Against Drug Abuse 

Taal-Net School is equivocally condemn drug abuse as they have gone on a street march to demonstrate against use of drugs by the youth.

Taal-Net Group of School Celebrations 

Taal-Net joined to the South Africa in celebration their Heritage Day in Kempton Park South Africa.

References 

2009 establishments in South Africa
Education in Zimbabwe